Družec is a municipality and village in Kladno District in the Central Bohemian Region of the Czech Republic. It has about 1,100 inhabitants.

Geography
It lies in the Křivoklát Highlands on the Loděnice River .

History
The first written mention of Družec is from 1320.

Transport
The D6 motorway from Prague to Karlovy Vary runs through the northern part of the municipality.

Sights
The pilgrimage Church of the Assumption of the Virgin Mary was first mentioned in 1352. The originally Gothic church was rebuilt in the Baroque style in 1688–1689.

Next to the church there is a sandstone Marian column from 1674 and a man-sized menhir called Zkamenělec ("Man-turned-into-stone"), surrounded with legends of a punished perjurer.

Gallery

References

External links

 

Villages in Kladno District